Jozef Žídek is a Slovak former figure skater who represented Czechoslovakia. He won the Czechoslovak national title in the 1969–70 season and would compete at five ISU Championships. His best result, 12th, came at the 1971 European Championships in Zurich, Switzerland. His skating club was KŠK Slovan Bratislava.

Competitive highlights

References 

Czechoslovak male single skaters
Living people
Slovak male single skaters
Figure skaters from Bratislava
Year of birth missing (living people)